Mateusz Lis (born 27 February 1997) is a Polish professional footballer who plays as a goalkeeper for Ligue 1 side Troyes, on loan from Premier League side Southampton.

Career

Lis started his career with Lech Poznań.

On 17 June 2022, Lis signed a five-year contract with Southampton pending a work permit, joining as a free agent following the expiry of his contract at Turkish club Altay S.K.

On 1 September 2022, Lis joined Troyes on a season long loan.

Career statistics

Club

References

External links
 
 

"

1997 births
Living people
People from Żary
Association football goalkeepers
Polish footballers
Poland youth international footballers
Lech Poznań II players
Lech Poznań players
Miedź Legnica players
Podbeskidzie Bielsko-Biała players
Raków Częstochowa players
Wisła Kraków players
Altay S.K. footballers
Southampton F.C. players
ES Troyes AC players
Ekstraklasa players
I liga players
II liga players
III liga players
Süper Lig players
Polish expatriate footballers
Expatriate footballers in Turkey
Polish expatriate sportspeople in Turkey
Expatriate footballers in England
Polish expatriate sportspeople in England
Expatriate footballers in France
Polish expatriate sportspeople in France